The 2012 Miami Marlins season was the 20th season for the Major League Baseball franchise. The Marlins moved into Marlins Park for the 2012 season; as part of the agreement, they changed their name from the "Florida Marlins" to the "Miami Marlins".  They failed to make the playoffs for the 9th consecutive season.

Season standings

NL East standings

NL Wild Card

Record vs. opponents

Game log 

|- style="text-align:center;" bgcolor="#ffbbbb"
| 1 || April 4 || Cardinals || L 1–4 || Lohse (1–0) || Johnson (0–1) || Motte (1) || 36,601 || 0–1 ||  
|- style="text-align:center;" bgcolor="#ffbbbb"
| 2 || April 5 || @ Reds || L 0–4 || Cueto (1–0) || Buehrle (0–1) || || 42,956 || 0–2 || 
|- style="text-align:center;" bgcolor="#bbffbb"
| 3 || April 7 || @ Reds || W 8–3 || Nolasco (1–0) || Latos 0–1 || || 41,662 || 1–2 || 
|- style="text-align:center;" bgcolor="#ffbbbb"
| 4 || April 8 || @ Reds || L 5–6 || Chapman (1–0) || Bell (0–1) || || 23,539 || 1–3 || 
|- style="text-align:center;" bgcolor="#bbffbb"
| 5 || April 9 || @ Phillies || W 6–2 || Sánchez (1–0) || Hamels (0–1) || || 45,574 || 2–3 || 
|- style="text-align:center;" bgcolor="#ffbbbb"
| 6 || April 11 || @ Phillies || L 1–7 || Halladay (2–0) || Johnson (0–2) || || 45,359 || 2–4 || 
|- style="text-align:center;" bgcolor="#ffbbbb"
| 7 || April 12 || @ Phillies || L 1–3 || Blanton (1–1) || Buehrle (0–2) || Papelbon (2) || 44,751 || 2–5 || 
|- style="text-align:center;" bgcolor="#bbffbb"
| 8 || April 13 || Astros || W 5–4 (11) || Webb (1–0) || Lyon (0–1) || || 30,169 || 3–5 || 
|- style="text-align:center;" bgcolor="#ffbbbb"
| 9 || April 14 || Astros || L 4–5 || Cruz (1–0) || Bell (0–2) || Myers (2) || 31,659 || 3–6 || 
|- style="text-align:center;" bgcolor="#bbffbb"
| 10 || April 15 || Astros || W 5–4 (11) || Gaudin (1–0) || Carpenter (0–1) || || 34,232 || 4–6 || 
|- style="text-align:center;" bgcolor="#bbffbb"
| 11 || April 17 || Cubs || W 5–2 || Cishek (1–0) || Dolis (0–1) || Bell (1) || 24,544 || 5–6 || 
|- style="text-align:center;" bgcolor="#bbffbb"
| 12 || April 18 || Cubs || W 9–1 || Buehrle (1–2) || Garza (1–1) || || 25,723 || 6–6 || 
|- style="text-align:center;" bgcolor="#bbffbb"
| 13 || April 19 || Cubs || W 5–3 || Nolasco (2–0) || Samardzija (2–1) || Bell (2) || 23,168 || 7–6 || 
|- style="text-align:center;" bgcolor="#ffbbbb"
| 14 || April 20 || @ Nationals || L 0–2 || Detwiler (2–0) || Zambrano (0–1) || Rodríguez (4) || 24,640 || 7–7 || 
|- style="text-align:center;" bgcolor="#ffbbbb"
| 15 || April 21 || @ Nationals || L 2–3 (10) || Gorzelanny (1–0) || Mujica (0–1) || || 26,745 || 7–8 || 
|- style="text-align:center;" bgcolor="#bbbbbb"
| – || April 22 || @ Nationals ||colspan=7|Game Postponed (rain) (rescheduled for August 3)
|- style="text-align:center;" bgcolor="#ffbbbb"
| 16 || April 24 || @ Mets || L 1–2 || Rauch (3–0) || Mujica (0–2) || Francisco (4) || 20,192 || 7–9 || 
|- style="text-align:center;" bgcolor="#ffbbbb"
| 17 || April 25 || @ Mets || L 1–5 || Dickey (3–1) || Buehrle (1–3) || || 20,623 || 7–10 || 
|- style="text-align:center;" bgcolor="#ffbbbb"
| 18 || April 26 || @ Mets || L 2–3 || Ramírez (2–1) || Bell (0–3) || || 20,660 || 7–11 || 
|- style="text-align:center;" bgcolor="#ffbbbb"
| 19 || April 27 || Diamondbacks || L 0–5 || Saunders (2–1) || Zambrano (0–2) || || 31,949 || 7–12 || 
|- style="text-align:center;" bgcolor="#bbffbb"
| 20 || April 28 || Diamondbacks || W 3–2 || Cishek (2–0) || Ziegler (0–1) || || 33,525 || 8–12 || 
|- style="text-align:center;" bgcolor="#ffbbbb"
| 21 || April 29 || Diamondbacks || L 4–8 || Miley (3–0) || Johnson (0–3) || || 34,918 || 8–13 || 
|- style="text-align:center;" bgcolor="#ffbbbb"
| 22 || April 30 || Diamondbacks || L 5–9 || Corbin (1–0) || Buehrle (1–4) || || 31,006 || 8–14 || 
|-

|- style="text-align:center;" bgcolor="#bbffbb"
| 23 || May 1 || @ Giants || W 2–1 || Nolasco (3–0) || Cain (1–2) || Bell (3) || 41,439 || 9–14 || 
|- style="text-align:center;" bgcolor="#bbffbb"
| 24 || May 2 || @ Giants || W 3–2 (10) || Cishek (3–0) || Casilla (0–1) || || 41,575 || 10–14 || 
|- style="text-align:center;" bgcolor="#bbffbb"
| 25 || May 3 || @ Giants || W 3–2 || Sánchez (2–0) || Vogelsong (0–2) || Mujica (1) || 41,159 || 11–14 || 
|- style="text-align:center;" bgcolor="#bbffbb"
| 26 || May 4 || @ Padres || W 9–8 (12) || Cishek (4–0) || Spence (0–1) || || 29,201 || 12–14 || 
|- style="text-align:center;" bgcolor="#bbffbb"
| 27 || May 5 || @ Padres || W 4–1 || Buehrle (2–4) || Richard (1–4) || || 25,076 || 13–14 || 
|- style="text-align:center;" bgcolor="#bbffbb"
| 28 || May 6 || @ Padres || W 6–3 || Nolasco (4–0) || Cashner (2–2) || Mujica (2) || 33,572 || 14–14 || 
|- style="text-align:center;" bgcolor="#bbffbb"
| 29 || May 7 || @ Astros || W 4–0 || Zambrano (1–2) || Rodríguez (3–3) || || 16,531 || 15–14 || 
|- style="text-align:center;" bgcolor="#ffbbbb"
| 30 || May 8 || @ Astros || L 2–3 || López (3–0) || Webb (1–1) || Myers (8) || 14,801 || 15–15 || 
|- style="text-align:center;" bgcolor="#bbffbb"
| 31 || May 9 || @ Astros || W 5–3 (12) || Webb (2–1) || Carpenter (0–2) || || 16,072 || 16–15 || 
|- style="text-align:center;" bgcolor="#bbffbb"
| 32 || May 11 || Mets || W 6–5 || Bell (1–3) || Francisco (1–2) || || 31,007 || 17–15 || 
|- style="text-align:center;" bgcolor="#ffbbbb"
| 33 || May 12 || Mets || L 3–9 || Dickey (5–1) || Nolasco (4–1) || || 32,128 || 17–16 || 
|- style="text-align:center;" bgcolor="#bbffbb"
| 34 || May 13 || Mets || W 8–4 || Bell (2–3) || Francisco (1–3) || || 26,401 || 18–16 || 
|- style="text-align:center;" bgcolor="#ffbbbb"
| 35 || May 14 || Pirates || L 2–3 || Lincoln (3–0) || Sánchez (2–1) || Hanrahan (7) || 25,666 || 18–17 || 
|- style="text-align:center;" bgcolor="#bbffbb"
| 36 || May 15 || Pirates || W 6–2 || Johnson (1–3) || Correia (1–4) || || 24,242 || 19–17 || 
|- style="text-align:center;" bgcolor="#bbffbb"
| 37 || May 16 || @ Braves || W 8–4 || Buehrle (3–4) || Minor (2–3) || || 21,106 || 20–17 || 
|- style="text-align:center;" bgcolor="#ffbbbb"
| 38 || May 17 || @ Braves || L 0–7 || Beachy (5–1) || Nolasco (4–2) || || 27,724 || 20–18 || 
|- style="text-align:center;" bgcolor="#bbffbb"
| 39 || May 18 || @ Indians || W 3–2 || Zambrano (2–2) || Sipp (0–2) || Bell (4) || 29,378 || 21–18 || 
|- style="text-align:center;" bgcolor="#ffbbbb"
| 40 || May 19 || @ Indians || L 0–2 || Gómez (3–2) || Sánchez (2–2) || Perez (13) || 29,799 || 21–19 || 
|- style="text-align:center;" bgcolor="#bbffbb"
| 41 || May 20 || @ Indians || W 5–3 || Johnson (2–3) || Lowe (6–2) || Bell (5) || 23,668 || 22–19 || 
|- style="text-align:center;" bgcolor="#bbffbb"
| 42 || May 21 || Rockies || W 7–4 || Buehrle (4–4) || Moyer (2–4) || Bell (6) || 25,155 || 23–19 || 
|- style="text-align:center;" bgcolor="#bbffbb"
| 43 || May 22 || Rockies || W 7–6 || Nolasco (5–2) || Nicasio (2–2) || Bell (7) || 22,242 || 24–19 || 
|- style="text-align:center;" bgcolor="#ffbbbb"
| 44 || May 23 || Rockies || L 4–8 || White (1–3) || Zambrano (2–3) || || 23,985 || 24–20 || 
|- style="text-align:center;" bgcolor="#ffbbbb"
| 45 || May 24 || Giants || L 7–14 || Vogelsong (3–2) || Sánchez (2–3) || || 24,099 || 24–21 || 
|- style="text-align:center;" bgcolor="#bbffbb"
| 46 || May 25 || Giants || W 7–6 || Jennings (1–0) || Lincecum (2–5) || Cishek (1) || 27,123 || 25–21 || 
|- style="text-align:center;" bgcolor="#bbffbb"
| 47 || May 26 || Giants || W 5–3 || Buehrle (5–4) || Bumgarner (5–4) || Choate (1) || 30,663 || 26–21 || 
|- style="text-align:center;" bgcolor="#ffbbbb"
| 48 || May 27 || Giants || L 2–3 || Cain (5–2) || Nolasco (5–3) || Casilla (12) || 30,199 || 26–22 || 
|- style="text-align:center;" bgcolor="#bbffbb"
| 49 || May 28 || Nationals || W 5–3 || Zambrano (3–3) || Zimmermann (3–5) || Bell (8) || 31,528 || 27–22 || 
|- style="text-align:center;" bgcolor="#bbffbb"
| 50 || May 29 || Nationals || W 3–1 || Sánchez (3–3) || Jackson (1–3) || Bell (9) || 25,969 || 28–22 || 
|- style="text-align:center;" bgcolor="#bbffbb"
| 51 || May 30 || Nationals || W 5–3 || Johnson (3–3) || Wang (1–1) || Bell (10) || 24,224 || 29–22 || 
|-

|- style="text-align:center;" bgcolor="#ffbbbb"
| 52 || June 1 || @ Phillies || L 4–6 || Kendrick (2–4) || Buehrle (5–5) || Papelbon (15) || 44,497 || 29–23 || 
|- style="text-align:center;" bgcolor="#bbffbb"
| 53 || June 2 || @ Phillies || W 5–4 || Nolasco (6–3) || Hamels (8–2) || Bell (11) || 45,509 || 30–23 || 
|- style="text-align:center;" bgcolor="#bbffbb"
| 54 || June 3 || @ Phillies || W 5–1 || Zambrano (4–3) || Blanton (4–6) || Bell (12) || 45,356 || 31–23 || 
|- style="text-align:center;" bgcolor="#ffbbbb"
| 55 || June 5 || Braves || L 0–11 || Hudson (4–2) || Sánchez (3–4) || || 25,432 || 31–24 || 
|- style="text-align:center;" bgcolor="#ffbbbb"
| 56 || June 6 || Braves || L 1–2 || Delgado (4–5) || Johnson (3–4) || Kimbrel (17) || 22,619 || 31–25 || 
|- style="text-align:center;" bgcolor="#ffbbbb"
| 57 || June 7 || Braves || L 2–8 || Minor (3–4) || Buehrle (5–6) || || 22,402 || 31–26 || 
|- style="text-align:center;" bgcolor="#ffbbbb"
| 58 || June 8 || Rays || L 1–5 || Badenhop (1–1) || Nolasco (6–4) || || 29,628 || 31–27 || 
|- style="text-align:center;" bgcolor="#ffbbbb"
| 59 || June 9 || Rays || L 4–13 || Moore (3–5) || Zambrano (4–4) || || 30,963 || 31–28 || 
|- style="text-align:center;" bgcolor="#ffbbbb"
| 60 || June 10 || Rays || L 2–4 || Shields (7–4) || Sánchez (3–5) || Rodney (18) || 31,111 || 31–29 || 
|- style="text-align:center;" bgcolor="#bbffbb"
| 61 || June 11 || Red Sox || W 4–1 || Johnson (4–4) || Beckett (4–7) || Bell (13) || 32,562 || 32–29 || 
|- style="text-align:center;" bgcolor="#ffbbbb"
| 62 || June 12 || Red Sox || L 1–2 || Buchholz (7–2) || Buehrle (5–7) || Aceves (15) || 29,326 || 32–30 || 
|- style="text-align:center;" bgcolor="#ffbbbb"
| 63 || June 13 || Red Sox || L 2–10 || Doubront (7–3) || Nolasco (6–5) || || 33,119 || 32–31 || 
|- style="text-align:center;" bgcolor="#ffbbbb"
| 64 || June 15 || @ Rays || L 0–11 || Moore (4–5) || Zambrano (4–5) || || 18,369 || 32–32 || 
|- style="text-align:center;" bgcolor="#bbffbb"
| 65 || June 16 || @ Rays || W 4–3 (15) || Webb (3–1) || Gomes (1–2) || Bell (14) || 22,332 || 33–32 || 
|- style="text-align:center;" bgcolor="#ffbbbb"
| 66 || June 17 || @ Rays || L 0–3 || Cobb (3–3) || Johnson (4–5) || Rodney (19) || 33,810 || 33–33 || 
|- style="text-align:center;" bgcolor="#ffbbbb"
| 67 || June 19 || @ Red Sox || L 5–7 || Buchholz (8–2) || Buehrle (5–8) || Aceves (17) || 37,701 || 33–34 || 
|- style="text-align:center;" bgcolor="#ffbbbb"
| 68 || June 20 || @ Red Sox || L 5–15 || Doubront (8–3) || Nolasco (6–6) || || 37,362 || 33–35 || 
|- style="text-align:center;" bgcolor="#ffbbbb"
| 69 || June 21 || @ Red Sox || L 5–6 || Atchison (2–0) || Mujica (0–3) || Aceves (18) || 37,261 || 33–36 || 
|- style="text-align:center;" bgcolor="#ffbbbb"
| 70 || June 22 || Blue Jays || L 5–12 || Romero (8–1) || Sánchez (3–6) || || 22,387 || 33–37 || 
|- style="text-align:center;" bgcolor="#ffbbbb"
| 71 || June 23 || Blue Jays || L 1–7 || Oliver (2–2) || Cishek (4–1) || || 24,448 || 33–38 || 
|- style="text-align:center;" bgcolor="#bbffbb"
| 72 || June 24 || Blue Jays || W 9–0 || Buehrle (6–8) || Chavez (0–1) || || 27,888 || 34–38 || 
|- style="text-align:center;" bgcolor="#ffbbbb"
| 73 || June 25 || Cardinals || L 7–8 (10) || Marte (2–1) || Gaudin (2–1) || Motte (15) || 27,369 || 34–39 || 
|- style="text-align:center;" bgcolor="#ffbbbb"
| 74 || June 26 || Cardinals || L 2–5 || Lohse (7–2) || Zambrano (4–6) || Motte (16) || 25,444 || 34–40 || 
|- style="text-align:center;" bgcolor="#bbffbb"
| 75 || June 27 || Cardinals || W 5–3 || Sánchez (4–6) || Freeman (0–1) || Bell (15) || 28,397 || 35–40 || 
|- style="text-align:center;" bgcolor="#bbffbb"
| 76 || June 29 || Phillies || W 6–2 || Johnson (5–5) || Lee (0–5) ||  || 28,246 || 36–40 || 
|- style="text-align:center;" bgcolor="#bbffbb"
| 77 || June 30 || Phillies || W 3–2 || Buehrle (7–8) || Hamels (10–4) || Bell (16) || 31,311 || 37–40 || 
|-

|- style="text-align:center;" bgcolor="#bbffbb"
| 78 || July 1 || Phillies || W 5–2 || Nolasco (7–6) || Blanton (7–7) || Bell (17) || 31,727 || 38–40 || 
|- style="text-align:center;" bgcolor="#ffbbbb"
| 79 || July 2 || @ Brewers || L 5–6 || Rodríguez (1–4) || Webb (3–2) || Axford (14) || 28,674 || 38–41 || 
|- style="text-align:center;" bgcolor="#ffbbbb"
| 80 || July 3 || @ Brewers || L 12–13 (10) || Hernández (2–1) || Bell (2–4) || || 33,178 || 38–42 || 
|- style="text-align:center;" bgcolor="#bbffbb"
| 81 || July 4 || @ Brewers || W 7–6 (10) || LeBlanc (1–0) || Parra (0–3) || Bell (18) || 31,910 || 39–42 || 
|- style="text-align:center;" bgcolor="#bbffbb"
| 82 || July 5 || @ Brewers || W 4–0 || Buehrle (8–8) || Fiers (3–3) || || 27,443 || 40–42 || 
|- style="text-align:center;" bgcolor="#bbffbb"
| 83 || July 6 || @ Cardinals || W 3–2 || Nolasco (8–6) || Westbrook (7–7) || Bell (19) || 46,721 || 41–42 || 
|- style="text-align:center;" bgcolor="#ffbbbb"
| 84 || July 7 || @ Cardinals || L 2–3 || Lohse (9–2) || Zambrano (4–7) || Motte (20) || 41,312 || 41–43 || 
|- style="text-align:center;" bgcolor="#ffbbbb"
| 85 || July 8 || @ Cardinals || L 4–5 || Boggs (2–1) || Bell (2–5) || || 38,436 || 41–44 || 
|- style="text-align:center;" bgcolor="#f0e68c"
| – || July 10 || colspan='8'|2012 Major League Baseball All-Star Game in Kansas City, Missouri
|- style="text-align:center;" bgcolor="#ffbbbb"
| 86 || July 13 || Nationals || L 1–5 || Zimmermann (6–6) || Johnson (5–6) || || 30,911 || 41–45 || 
|- style="text-align:center;" bgcolor="#bbffbb"
| 87 || July 14 || Nationals || W 2–1 || Buehrle (9–8) || Gonzalez (12–4) || Cishek (2) || 28,707 || 42–45 || 
|- style="text-align:center;" bgcolor="#ffbbbb"
| 88 || July 15 || Nationals || L 0–4 || Strasburg (10–4) || Nolasco (8–7) || || 29,889 || 42–46 || 
|- style="text-align:center;" bgcolor="#bbffbb"
| 89 || July 16 || Nationals || W 5–3 || Zambrano (5–7) || Jackson (5–5) || Dunn (1) || 29,248 || 43–46 || 
|- style="text-align:center;" bgcolor="#bbffbb"
| 90 || July 17 || @ Cubs || W 9–5 || Sánchez (5–6) || Wood (4–4) || || 34,397 || 44–46 || 
|- style="text-align:center;" bgcolor="#ffbbbb"
| 91 || July 18 || @ Cubs || L 1–5 (8) || Russell (3–0) || Johnson (5–7) || || 34,934 || 44–47 || 
|- style="text-align:center;" bgcolor="#ffbbbb"
| 92 || July 19 || @ Cubs || L 2–4 || Maholm (8–6) || Buehrle (9–9) || Mármol (11) || 32,741 || 44–48 || 
|- style="text-align:center;" bgcolor="#ffbbbb"
| 93 || July 20 || @ Pirates || L 3–4 || Correia (7–6) || Nolasco (8–8) || Hanrahan (27) || 37,193 || 44–49 || 
|- style="text-align:center;" bgcolor="#ffbbbb"
| 94 || July 21 || @ Pirates || L 1–5 || Burnett (11–3) || Zambrano (5–8) || Lincoln (1) || 39,411 || 44–50 || 
|- style="text-align:center;" bgcolor="#ffbbbb"
| 95 || July 22 || @ Pirates || L 0–3 || Karstens (3–2) || Sánchez (5–7) || Hanrahan (28) || 34,203 || 44–51 || 
|- style="text-align:center;" bgcolor="#bbffbb"
| 96 || July 23 || Braves || W 2–1 || Johnson (6–7) || Minor (5–7) || Cishek (3) || 29,019 || 45–51 || 
|- style="text-align:center;" bgcolor="#ffbbbb"
| 97 || July 24 || Braves || L 3–4 || Hudson (9–4) || LeBlanc (1–1) || Kimbrel (29) || 25,616 || 45–52 || 
|- style="text-align:center;" bgcolor="#ffbbbb"
| 98 || July 25 || Braves || L 1–7 || Hanson (11–5) || Nolasco (8–9) || || 36,711 || 45–53 || 
|- style="text-align:center;" bgcolor="#ffbbbb"
| 99 || July 27 || Padres || L 2–7 || Wells (2–3) || Zambrano (5–9) || || 23,161 || 45–54 || 
|- style="text-align:center;" bgcolor="#bbffbb"
| 100 || July 28 || Padres || W 4–2 || Eovaldi (2–6) || Ohlendorf (3–1) || Cishek (4) || 26,401 || 46–54 || 
|- style="text-align:center;" bgcolor="#bbffbb"
| 101 || July 29 || Padres || W 5–4 (10) || Webb (4–2) || Brach (0–2) || || 27,730 || 47–54 || 
|- style="text-align:center;" bgcolor="#ffbbbb"
| 102 || July 30 || @ Braves || L 2–8 || Hanson (12–5) || Buehrle (9–10) || || 22,624 || 47–55 || 
|- style="text-align:center;" bgcolor="#ffbbbb"
| 103 || July 31 || @ Braves || L 1–7 || Medlen (2–1) || Nolasco (8–10) || || 21,819 || 47–56 || 
|-

|- style="text-align:center;" bgcolor="#bbffbb"
| 104 || August 1 || @ Braves || W 4–2 || Zambrano (6–9) || Sheets (3–1) || Cishek (5) || 18,133 || 48–56 || 
|- style="text-align:center;" bgcolor="#ffbbbb"
| 105 || August 2 || @ Braves || L 1–6 || Martínez (5–2) || Eovaldi (2–7) || || 19,685 || 48–57 || 
|- style="text-align:center;" bgcolor="#ffbbbb"
| 106 || August 3  || @ Nationals || L 4–7 || Lannan (2–0) || Hand (0–1) || Clippard (22) || || 48–58 || 
|- style="text-align:center;" bgcolor="#bbffbb"
| 107 || August 3  || @ Nationals || W 5–2 || Johnson (7–7) || Gonzalez (13–6) || Cishek (6) || 32,334 || 49–58 || 
|- style="text-align:center;" bgcolor="#ffbbbb"
| 108 || August 4 || @ Nationals || L 7–10 || Mattheus (4–1) || Dunn (0–1) || || 33,449 || 49–59 || 
|- style="text-align:center;" bgcolor="#ffbbbb"
| 109 || August 5 || @ Nationals || L 1–4 || Strasburg (12–5) || Nolasco (8–11) || Storen (1)  || 30,453 || 49–60 || 
|- style="text-align:center;" bgcolor="#bbffbb"
| 110 || August 7 || @ Mets || W 4–2 || Zambrano (7–9) || Niese (8–6) || Cishek (7) || 28,968 || 50–60 || 
|- style="text-align:center;" bgcolor="#bbffbb"
| 111 || August 8 || @ Mets || W 13–0 || Eovaldi (3–7) || Young (3–6) || || 26,193 || 51–60 || 
|- style="text-align:center;" bgcolor="#ffbbbb"
| 112 || August 9 || @ Mets || L 1–6 || Dickey (15–3) || Johnson (7–8) || || 28,985 || 51–61 || 
|- style="text-align:center;" bgcolor="#ffbbbb"
| 113 || August 10 || Dodgers || L 2–5 || Kershaw (10–6) || Buehrle (9–11) || Jansen (23) || 28,130 || 51–62 || 
|- style="text-align:center;" bgcolor="#bbffbb"
| 114 || August 11 || Dodgers || W 7–3 || Nolasco (9–11) || Blanton (8–10) || || 27,681 || 52–62 || 
|- style="text-align:center;" bgcolor="#ffbbbb"
| 115 || August 12 || Dodgers || L 0–5 || Capuano (11–8) || LeBlanc (1–2) || || 28,388 || 52–63 || 
|- style="text-align:center;" bgcolor="#ffbbbb"
| 116 || August 13 || Phillies || L 0–4 || Hamels (13–6) || Eovaldi (3–8) || || 23,309 || 52–64 || 
|- style="text-align:center;" bgcolor="#ffbbbb"
| 117 || August 14 || Phillies || L 0–1 || Kendrick (5–9) || Johnson (7–9) || Papelbon (26) || 23,879 || 52–65 || 
|- style="text-align:center;" bgcolor="#bbffbb"
| 118 || August 15 || Phillies || W 9–2 || Buehrle (10–11) || Halladay (6–7) || || 22,450 || 53–65 || 
|- style="text-align:center;" bgcolor="#ffbbbb"
| 119 || August 16 || @ Rockies || L 3–5 || Ottavino (4–1) || Nolasco (9–12) || Betancourt (22) || 24,807 || 53–66 || 
|- style="text-align:center;" bgcolor="#bbffbb"
| 120 || August 17 || @ Rockies || W 6–5 || LeBlanc (2–2) || Roenicke (4–1) || Cishek (8) || 25,614 || 54–66 || 
|- style="text-align:center;" bgcolor="#bbffbb"
| 121 || August 18 || @ Rockies || W 6–5 || Eovaldi (4–8) || Chatwood (3–3) || Cishek (9) || 30,426 || 55–66 || 
|- style="text-align:center;" bgcolor="#ffbbbb"
| 122 || August 19 || @ Rockies || L 2–3 || Ottavino (5–1) || Johnson (7–10) || Betancourt (23) || 43,961 || 55–67 || 
|- style="text-align:center;" bgcolor="#bbffbb"
| 123 || August 20 || @ Diamondbacks || W 12–3 || Buehrle (11–11) || Saunders (6–10) || || 17,707 || 56–67 || 
|- style="text-align:center;" bgcolor="#bbffbb"
| 124 || August 21 || @ Diamondbacks || W 6–5 (10) || Gaudin (2–1) || Demel (0–1) || Cishek (10) || 17,434 || 57–67 || 
|- style="text-align:center;" bgcolor="#ffbbbb"
| 125 || August 22 || @ Diamondbacks || L 2–3 || Skaggs (1–0) || Turner (1–2) || Putz (25) || 17,239 || 57–68 || 
|- style="text-align:center;" bgcolor="#ffbbbb"
| 126 || August 22 || @ Diamondbacks || L 0–3 || Miley (14–8) || LeBlanc (2–3) || Putz (26) || 20,027 || 57–69 || 
|- style="text-align:center;" bgcolor="#ffbbbb"
| 127 || August 24 || @ Dodgers || L 4–11 || Wright (5–3) || Eovaldi (4–9) || || 39,805 || 57–70 || 
|- style="text-align:center;" bgcolor="#ffbbbb"
| 128 || August 25 || @ Dodgers || L 2–8 || Kershaw (12–7) || Johnson (7–11) || || 40,284 || 57–71 || 
|- style="text-align:center;" bgcolor="#bbffbb"
| 129 || August 26 || @ Dodgers || W 6–2 || Buehrle (12–11) || Harang (9–8) || Cishek (11) || 41,907 || 58–71 || 
|- style="text-align:center;" bgcolor="#bbffbb"
| 130 || August 28 || Nationals || W 9–0 || Nolasco (10–12) || Strasburg (15–6) || || 24,877 || 59–71 || 
|- style="text-align:center;" bgcolor="#ffbbbb"
| 131 || August 29 || Nationals || L 4–8 || Detwiler (8–6) || Turner (1–3) || || 24,909 || 59–72 || 
|- style="text-align:center;" bgcolor="#ffbbbb"
| 132 || August 31 || Mets || L 0–3 || Dickey (17–4) || Eovaldi (4–10) || || 23,099 || 59–73 || 
|-

|-  style="text-align:center;" bgcolor="#ffbbbb"
| 133 || September 1 || Mets || L 3–5 || Ramírez (3–3) || Cishek (4–2) || Francisco (23) || 26,402 || 59–74 || 
|-  style="text-align:center;" bgcolor="#ffbbbb"
| 134 || September 2 || Mets || L 1–5 || Young (4–7) || Buehrle (12–12) || || 25,333 || 59–75 || 
|-  style="text-align:center;" bgcolor="#bbffbb"
| 135 || September 3 || Brewers || W 7–3 || Nolasco (11–12) || Fiers (8–7) || Cishek (12) || 22,391 || 60–75 || 
|-  style="text-align:center;" bgcolor="#ffbbbb"
| 136 || September 4 || Brewers || L 4–8 || Loe (6–4) || Dunn (0–2) || Axford (24) || 23,403 || 60–76 || 
|-  style="text-align:center;" bgcolor="#ffbbbb"
| 137 || September 5 || Brewers || L 5–8 || Peralta (1–0) || Eovaldi (4–11) || Axford (25) || 22,288 || 60–77 || 
|-  style="text-align:center;" bgcolor="#bbffbb"
| 138 || September 6 || Brewers || W 6–2 || Johnson (8–11) || Estrada (2–6) || || 18,707 || 61–77 || 
|-  style="text-align:center;" bgcolor="#bbffbb"
| 139 || September 7 || @ Nationals || W 9–7 (10) || Gaudin (3–1) || Clippard (2–4) || Cishek (13) || 28,533 || 62–77 || 
|-  style="text-align:center;" bgcolor="#ffbbbb"
| 140 || September 8 || @ Nationals || L 6–7 (10) || Storen (2–1) || Gaudin (3–2) || || 28,860 || 62–78 || 
|-  style="text-align:center;" bgcolor="#bbffbb"
| 141 || September 9 || @ Nationals || W 8–0 || Nolasco (12–12) || Jackson (9–10) || || 24,396 || 63–78 || 
|-  style="text-align:center;" bgcolor="#ffbbbb"
| 142 || September 10 || @ Phillies || L 1–3 || Kendrick (9–10) || LeBlanc (2–4) || Bastardo (1) || 41,505 || 63–79 || 
|-  style="text-align:center;" bgcolor="#ffbbbb"
| 143 || September 11 || @ Phillies || L 7–9 || Halladay (10–7) || Eovaldi (4–12) || Papelbon (33) || 42,028 || 63–80 || 
|-  style="text-align:center;" bgcolor="#ffbbbb"
| 144 || September 12 || @ Phillies || L 1–3 || Lee (5–7) || Johnson (8–12) || Papelbon (34) || 42,178 || 63–81 || 
|-  style="text-align:center;" bgcolor="#bbffbb"
| 145 || September 14 || Reds || W 4–0 || Turner (2–3) || Arroyo (12–8) || || 27,111 || 64–81 || 
|-  style="text-align:center;" bgcolor="#bbffbb"
| 146 || September 15 || Reds || W 6–4 || Buehrle (13–12) || Cueto (17–9) || Cishek (14) || 27,502 || 65–81 || 
|-  style="text-align:center;" bgcolor="#ffbbbb"
| 147 || September 16 || Reds || L 4–5 (11) || Ondrusek (4–2) || Zambrano (7–10) || Broxton (25) || 24,983 || 65–82 || 
|-  style="text-align:center;" bgcolor="#ffbbbb"
| 148 || September 17 || Braves || L 5–7 || Hudson (15–6) || LeBlanc (2–5) || Kimbrel (37) || 23,308 || 65–83 || 
|-  style="text-align:center;" bgcolor="#bbffbb"
| 149 || September 18 || Braves || W 4–3 (10) || Bell (3–5) || Gearrin (0–1) || || 23,009 || 66–83 || 
|-  style="text-align:center;" bgcolor="#ffbbbb"
| 150 || September 19 || Braves || L 0–3 || Medlen (9–1) || Johnson (8–13) || Kimbrel (38) || 25,998 || 66–84 || 
|-  style="text-align:center;" bgcolor="#ffbbbb"
| 151 || September 21 || @ Mets || L 3–7 || Niese (12–9) || Turner (2–4) || || 25,446 || 66–85 || 
|-  style="text-align:center;" bgcolor="#ffbbbb"
| 152 || September 22 || @ Mets || L 3–4 || Dickey (19–6) || Buehrle (13–13) || Rauch (4) || 30,332 || 66–86 || 
|- style="text-align:center;" bgcolor="#ffbbbb"
| 153 || September 23 || @ Mets || L 2–3 || Parnell (5–4) || Webb (4–3) || || 26,923 || 66–87 || 
|- style="text-align:center;" bgcolor="#ffbbbb"
| 154 || September 25 || @ Braves || L 3–4 || Kimbrel (3–1) || Dunn (0–3) || || 25,632 || 66–88 || 
|- style="text-align:center;" bgcolor="#ffbbbb"
| 155 || September 26 || @ Braves || L 0–3 || Maholm (13–10) || Johnson (8–14) || Kimbrel (40) || 23,420 || 66–89 || 
|- style="text-align:center;" bgcolor="#ffbbbb"
| 156 || September 27 || @ Braves || L 2–6 || Hanson (13–9) || Turner (2–5) || || 27,270 || 66–90 || 
|- style="text-align:center;"  bgcolor="#bbffbb"
| 157 || September 28 || Phillies || W 2–1 || Cishek (5–2) || Lindblom (3–4) || || 28,201 || 67–90 || 
|- style="text-align:center;" bgcolor="#ffbbbb"
| 158 || September 29 || Phillies || L 5–9 || Halladay (11–8) || Nolasco (12–13) || || 30,202 || 67–91 || 
|- style="text-align:center;" bgcolor="#ffbbbb"
| 159 || September 30 || Phillies || L 1–4 || Hamels (17–6) || Eovaldi (4–13) || Papelbon (38) || 28,317 || 67–92 || 
|-

|- style="text-align:center;" bgcolor="#bbffbb"
| 160 || October 1 || Mets || W 3–2 || Bell (4–5) || Ramírez  (3–4) || Cishek (15) || 24,543|| 68–92|| 
|- style="text-align:center;" bgcolor="#bbffbb"
| 161 || October 2 || Mets || W 4–3 (11) || Gaudin (4–2) || McHugh (0–4) || || 29,709 || 69–92 || 
|- style="text-align:center;" bgcolor="#ffbbbb"
| 162 || October 3 || Mets || L 2–4 || Hefner (4–7) || Koehler (0–1) || Parnell  (7) || 27,418 || 69–93 || 
|-

Roster

2012 Player stats

Batting
Note: G = Games played; AB = At bats; R = Runs scored; H = Hits; 2B = Doubles; 3B = Triples; HR = Home runs; RBI = Runs batted in; AVG = Batting average; SB = Stolen bases

Pitching
Note: W = Wins; L = Losses; ERA = Earned run average; G = Games pitched; GS = Games started;  SV = Saves; IP = Innings pitched; H = Hits allowed; R = Runs allowed; ER = Earned runs allowed; BB = Walks allowed;  K = Strikeouts

Farm system

References

External links

2012 Miami Marlins season at Baseball Reference

Miami Marlins seasons
Miami Marlins season
Miami